Slaven Musa (born 21 June 1971) is a Bosnian professional football manager and former player.

He is mostly known for playing for Zrinjski Mostar, spending 6 years in total at the club, from 1992 to 1993 and from 1997 to 2002.

Playing career
Born in Mostar, Musa started his career at hometown club Velež in 1989. His next club was Velež's fierce city rivals Zrinjski Mostar, where he was the first captain of the club after its refurbishment in 1992. 

Musla also played for Šibenik and Široki Brijeg. In 1997, he returned to Zrinjski, where he played the last 5 years of his career. He was one of the club's best players at the time. In 2001, Musa received the trophy "Filip Šunjić - Pipa" as best player of the club on field and outside of it for the 2000–01 season.

In the media he was often emphasizing his love for the club and its supporters. In 2002, Musa finished his playing career at the age of only 31.

Managerial career
After finishing his playing career, Musa was an assistant coach at Zrinjski Mostar in the seasons 2002–03 and 2003–04. He led the first team in one match. After Zrinjski, he went to Branitelj and stayed the club manager for 4 years. In the meantime, Musa earned an UEFA Pro Licence.

His ambition was to be the manager of bigger clubs in the country, like Široki Brijeg or Zrinjski one day. In 2010, Musa and his team Branitelj made a sensation, by eliminating Premier League club Leotar from the Bosnian Cup.

In November 2010, he was appointed as Zrinjski manager, and his longtime wish finally came true. He stayed as manager of Zrinjski for about two years, before resigning after not as good results as he hoped six rounds before the end of the 2011–12 league season.

At the beginning of the 2012–13 season, Musa became new manager of GOŠK Gabela. He left the club after a series of bad results.

The same year Musa became the new manager of Široki Brijeg. In his first season with the club he won the Bosnian Cup beating Željezničar on penalties. After 3 years of managing Široki Brijeg, in April 2015, Musa was sacked. Though, after only 5 months after his firing, he was once again named manager of Široki. On his own behalf, he left the club in July 2016.

Musa then was the manager of Vitez from 2016 to 2017, GOŠK Gabela in 2017 and Čelik Zenica in 2018.

In June 2018, Musa became the new head coach of the Bosnia and Herzegovina U-19 national team. On 25 January 2020, he was named as an assistant of Bosnia and Herzegovina national team head coach Dušan Bajević.

Honours

Player
Široki Brijeg 
First League of Herzeg-Bosnia: 1995–96, 1996–97

Manager
Široki Brijeg 
Bosnian Cup: 2012–13

References

External links

1971 births
Living people
Sportspeople from Mostar
Croats of Bosnia and Herzegovina
Association football midfielders
Yugoslav footballers
Bosnia and Herzegovina footballers
FK Velež Mostar players
HŠK Zrinjski Mostar players
HNK Šibenik players
NK Imotski players
NK Široki Brijeg players
Yugoslav First League players
Premier League of Bosnia and Herzegovina players
Croatian Football League players
Bosnia and Herzegovina expatriate footballers
Expatriate footballers in Croatia
Bosnia and Herzegovina expatriate sportspeople in Croatia
Bosnia and Herzegovina football managers
HŠK Zrinjski managers
NK GOŠK Gabela managers
NK Široki Brijeg managers
NK Vitez managers
NK Čelik Zenica managers
Premier League of Bosnia and Herzegovina managers